Sigurd Magnusson (1089 – 26 March 1130), also known as Sigurd the Crusader (Old Norse: Sigurðr Jórsalafari, Norwegian: Sigurd Jorsalfar), was King of Norway (being Sigurd I) from 1103 to 1130. His rule, together with his half-brother Øystein (until Øystein died in 1123), has been regarded by historians as a golden age for the medieval Kingdom of Norway. He is otherwise famous for leading the Norwegian Crusade (1107–1110), earning the eponym "the Crusader", and was the first European king to personally participate in a crusade.

Early life
Sigurd was one of the three sons of King Magnus III, the other two being Øystein and Olaf. They were all illegitimate sons of the king with different mothers. To avoid feuds or war, the three half-brothers co-ruled the kingdom from 1103. Sigurd ruled alone after Olaf died in 1115 and Øystein in 1123.

Before being proclaimed King of Norway, Sigurd was styled as King of the Isles and Earl of Orkney. Neither Øystein nor Olav received such prestigious titles. Sigurd passed the Earldom of Orkney on to Haakon Paulsson.

Many historians have viewed Sigurd and Øystein's rule as a golden age for the medieval Kingdom of Norway. The state flourished economically and culturally, allowing Sigurd's participation in the Crusades and gaining international recognition and prestige.

Expedition with Magnus III 

In 1098, Sigurd accompanied his father, King Magnus III, on his expedition to the Orkney Islands, Hebrides and the Irish Sea. He was made Earl of Orkney the same year, following the swift removal of the incumbent earls of Orkney, Paul and Erlend Thorfinnsson. He was also apparently made King of the Isles in that same year, following the overthrow of their king by his father, Magnus. Although Magnus was not directly responsible for the death of the previous king of the Isles, he became the next ruler of the kingdom, most likely due to his conquest of the islands. This was the first time the kingdom had been under direct control of a Norwegian king. It is not certain whether Sigurd returned home with his father to Norway after the 1098 expedition. However, it is known that he was in Orkney when Magnus returned west in 1102 for his next expedition. While there, a marriage alliance was negotiated between Magnus and Muircheartach Ua Briain. He proclaimed himself High King of Ireland, as he was one of the most powerful rulers in Ireland, as well as the ruler of Dublin. Sigurd was to marry Muirchertach's daughter Bjaðmunjo, a young Irish princess and for a short period, queen. The marriage might not even have been consummated.

When King Magnus was ambushed and killed in Ulaid by an Irish army in 1103, the 14-year-old Sigurd returned to Norway along with the rest of the Norwegian army, leaving his child-bride behind. Upon arriving in Norway, he and his two brothers, Øystein and Olav, were proclaimed kings of Norway and jointly ruled the kingdom together for some time. The expeditions conducted by Magnus were somewhat profitable to the Kingdom of Norway, as the many islands under Norwegian control generated wealth and manpower. However the Hebrides and Man quickly re-asserted their independence after Magnus' death.

Norwegian Crusade 

In 1107, Sigurd led the Norwegian Crusade to support the newly established Kingdom of Jerusalem which had been founded after the First Crusade. He was the first European king to personally lead a crusade, and his feats earned him the nickname Jorsalafari. Sigurd possessed a total force of about 5000 men in about 60 ships, as recorded by the sagas. The two kings, Øystein  and Sigurd, initially disputed about who should lead the contingent and who should remain home to rule the kingdom. Sigurd was eventually chosen to lead the crusade, possibly because he was a more experienced traveler, having been on several expeditions with his father, Magnus III, to Ireland and islands in the seas around Scotland.

Sigurd fought in Lisbon, various Mediterranean islands and Palestine. He would often fight the enemies himself, amongst his loyal soldiers and kinsmen; they were continually victorious and vastly successful, gaining considerable amounts of treasure and booty. However, the loot probably never reached Norway, as Sigurd left almost everything he had gained in Constantinople. On his way to Jerusalem (Jorsala) he visited the Norman King Roger II of Sicily in his castle at Palermo.

Upon arriving in the Holy Land he was greeted by King Baldwin I of Jerusalem. He received a warm welcome, and spent much time with the king. The two kings rode to the Jordan River, where Sigurd might have been baptized. King Baldwin asked Sigurd to join him and Ordelafo Faliero, Doge of Venice in the capture of the coastal city of Sidon, which had been re-fortified by the Fatimids in 1098.  The Siege of Sidon was a great success for the crusaders, and the city was conquered on 5 December 1110. Eustace Grenier was granted the Lordship of Sidon after the city was captured.  By order of Baldwin and the patriarch of Jerusalem, Ghibbelin of Arles, a splinter was taken from the True Cross and given to Sigurd after the siege, as a token of friendship and as a relic for his heroic participation in the crusades. Thereafter, King Sigurd returned to his ships and prepared to leave the Holy Land. They sailed north to the island of Cyprus, where Sigurd stayed for a time. Sigurd then sailed to Constantinople (Miklagard) and entered the city through the gate called the Gold Tower, riding in front of his men. He stayed there for a while, meeting and spending much time with Emperor Alexios I Komnenos.

Return to Norway 
Before leaving Constantinople, Sigurd gave all of his ships and many treasures away to Emperor Alexios. In return the emperor gave him many strong horses, for him and his fellow kinsmen. Sigurd planned to return to Norway over land, but many of his men stayed behind in Constantinople, to take up service for the emperor as part of his Varangian Guard. The trip took three years and he visited many countries en route. Sigurd traveled from Serbia and Bulgaria, through Hungary, Pannonia, Swabia and Bavaria where he met with the Emperor Lothar II of the Holy Roman Empire. He later arrived in Denmark where he was greeted by King Niels of Denmark, who eventually gave him a ship in which to sail to Norway.

Upon returning to Norway in 1111, Sigurd came back to a flourishing and prosperous kingdom. King Øystein had created a strong and stable country and the church  gained more wealth, power and prestige. During Sigurd's reign, the tithe (a 10% tax to support the church) was introduced in Norway, which greatly strengthened the church in the country. Sigurd also founded the diocese of Stavanger. He had been denied divorce by the bishop in Bergen, so he simply installed another bishop further south and had him perform the divorce.

Sigurd made his capital in Konghelle (in the vicinity of Kungälv in present-day Sweden) and built a strong castle there. He also kept the relic given to him by King Baldwin, a splinter reputed to be from the True Cross. In 1123, Sigurd once again set out to fight in the name of the church, this time in the Swedish Crusade to Småland in Sweden. The inhabitants had reportedly renounced Christianity and were again worshiping Old Norse deities.

Death 
Sigurd died in 1130 and was buried in Hallvard's church (Hallvardskirken) in Oslo. Sigurd was married to Malmfred, a daughter of Grand Prince Mstislav I of Kiev and granddaughter of King Inge I of Sweden. They had a daughter, Kristin Sigurdsdatter. 
He left no legitimate sons. Magnus, his illegitimate son with Borghild Olavsdotter, became king of Norway. He shared the throne in an uneasy peace with another claimant, Harald Gille. This led to a power struggle following Sigurd's death between various illegitimate sons and other royal pretenders, which escalated into a lengthy and devastating civil war. This gave rise to long feuds over who should rule the Kingdom of Norway in the 12th century and early 13th century.

Primary sources
Most of the information gathered about the saga of Sigurd and his brothers is taken from the Heimskringla, written by Snorri Sturluson around 1225. The accuracy of this work is still debated by scholars. Sigurd is also mentioned in various European sources.

In theatrical works 
In the 19th century, Bjørnstjerne Bjørnson wrote a historical drama based on the life of the king, with incidental music (titled Sigurd Jorsalfar) composed by Edvard Grieg.

Notes

Other sources
 Bergan, Halvor  (2005) Kong Sigurds Jorsalferd. Den unge kongen som ble Norges helt (Norgesforlaget) 
 Morten, Øystein (2014) Jakten på Sigurd Jorsalfare  (Spartacus)

Related reading
 Riley-Smith, Jonathan (1986) The First Crusade and the Idea of Crusading (University of Pennsylvania Press)

External links
 Sigurd the Crusader: Stories from His Saga

1089 births
1130 deaths
12th-century rulers of the Kingdom of the Isles
12th-century Norwegian monarchs
Monarchs of the Isle of Man
Norwegian Roman Catholics
Roman Catholic monarchs
House of Hardrada
Medieval child monarchs
Burials at Akershus Fortress
Christians of the Norwegian Crusade
History of Bohuslän